Adolph Caspar Miller (January 7, 1866 - February 11, 1953) was an American economist who served as a member of the Federal Reserve Board of Governors from 1914 to 1936. Miller was a notable benefactor of the University of California, Berkeley, of which he was a graduate and professor of economics.

Early life
Miller was born in San Francisco on January 7, 1866.  After receiving his degree from the University of California, he studied abroad in Paris and Munich  Miller served as an instructor at Harvard University, and then spent one year each as an assistant professor at his alma mater and at Cornell University before being hired as a full professor of finance at the University of Chicago.  While in Chicago, in 1895, Miller married Mary Sprague, daughter of a prominent Chicago businessman.

University and political career
In 1902, Benjamin Wheeler, President of the University of California, persuaded Miller to return to Berkeley as Flood Professor of Finance, and to take charge of the College of Commerce, predecessor of today's Haas School of Business.  Miller remained there until 1913.  In that year, Miller's classmate and friend, Franklin Knight Lane was appointed as Secretary of the Interior by Woodrow Wilson, and Lane persuaded Miller to come to Washington to serve as Assistant Secretary.  In May 1913, Miller was also appointed as Director of the Bureau of National Parks.

In 1914, Miller was appointed one of the original governors of the Federal Reserve System, which had been established late the previous year.  The terms of the initial governors were staggered, and Miller received the longest initial term, ten years.  Miller was the sole economist on the Board during World War I, and he supported policies which would reduce spending by the public, principally through higher taxes.

He served 22 years in that capacity before retiring in 1936.  He remained a significant benefactor to the University of California, and its Miller Institute for Basic Research in Science was both endowed by money left to the university, and named for him.

His house in the Kalorama neighborhood of Washington DC, designed in 1924 by Baltimore architect Hall Pleasants Pennington, still stands at 2230 S Street NW.

References

Bibliography

External links
Statements and Speeches of Adolph C. Miller

1866 births
1947 deaths
Cornell University faculty
Federal Reserve System governors
Harvard University alumni
People from Kalorama (Washington, D.C.)
University of California, Berkeley alumni
University of California, Berkeley faculty
University of Chicago faculty
Woodrow Wilson administration personnel
Harding administration personnel
Coolidge administration personnel
Hoover administration personnel
Franklin D. Roosevelt administration personnel
Journal of Political Economy editors